Robert J. Ritchie was a lawyer and politician in New Brunswick, Canada. He represented St. John County in the Legislative Assembly of New Brunswick from 1878 to 1890.

He was born in Saint John, New Brunswick, of Irish descent. Ritchie was called to the bar in 1867. He served as solicitor general in the province's Executive Council.

References 
The Canadian parliamentary companion, 1889 JA Gemmill

Year of birth missing
Year of death missing
Members of the Legislative Assembly of New Brunswick
Canadian people of Irish descent
Lawyers in New Brunswick
Members of the Executive Council of New Brunswick